Otter Falls (also Otter Slide, Otter Slide Falls or Otter Creek Falls) is a waterfall in King County, Washington; on the southern wall of Mount Anderson. The drainage of Otter Creek, which feeds the falls, is fairly small, and consists mostly of granite which does not retain water. Therefore, the waterfall relies entirely on snowmelt to flow and often dries up by July.

Notes

Waterfalls of King County, Washington